2-Iodophenol (o-iodophenol) is an aromatic organic compound with the formula IC6H4OH.  It is a pale yellow solid that melts near room temperature. It undergoes a variety of coupling reactions in which the iodine substituent is replaced by a new carbon group ortho to the hydroxy group of the phenol, which can be followed by cyclization to form heterocycles.  

It can be prepared by treatment of 2-chloromercuriphenol with iodine:

Direct reaction of phenol with iodine gives a mixture of 2- and 4-iodo derivatives.

References 

Iodoarenes
Phenols